Erin Joe is currently working for FireEye/Mandiant as their Senior Vice President of Strategy and Alliances.

Erin Joe was the 2nd director of the U.S. government's Cyber Threat Intelligence Integration Center.

Joe was previously a senior executive over cyber operations at the Federal Bureau of Investigation (FBI). She served as a special agent in the FBI for 22 years.

References

Trump administration personnel
Living people
Year of birth missing (living people)